Stellwagen is a German occupational surname, which means "cart-maker" or "cartwright", from the Middle High German stelle ("cart") and wagen ("wagon").  The name may refer to:

Daniël Stellwagen (born 1987), Dutch chess player
Friederich Stellwagen (1603–1660), German organ builder

References

German-language surnames
Occupational surnames